Death Is Not Glamorous was a Norwegian hardcore band from Oslo, Norway.

History
In 2005, Death Is Not Glamorous released  a demo, titled Demo 2005. In 2006, Death Is Not Glamorous released an EP titled Undercurrents. In 2007, the band released a split with the band The Down and Outs. The band also released a split with the band Another Year in 2007. Death Is Not Glamorous released their first full-length album in 2008, titled Soft Clicks. In 2011, the band released their second album, Spring Forward. In 2013, the band released a split with the band Shook Ones via Run for Cover Records.

References

Musical groups established in 2005
2005 establishments in Norway
Musical groups from Oslo
Norwegian hardcore punk groups